McCarney is a surname. Notable people with the surname include:

Dan McCarney (born 1953), American football coach
Jamie McCarney, Australian actor
Wayne McCarney (born 1966), Australian cyclist

See also
McCartney (surname)